The 1948 Los Angeles Dons season was their third in the All-America Football Conference. The team matched their previous output of 7–7, but failed to qualify for the playoffs for the third consecutive season.

The team's statistical leaders included Glenn Dobbs with 2,403 passing yards and 539 rushing yards and Joe Aguirre with 599 receiving yards and 56 points scored.

Season schedule

Division standings

References

Los Angeles Dons seasons
Los Angeles Dons
Los Angeles Dons